The Palm Beach Atlantic Sailfish are the athletic teams that represent Palm Beach Atlantic University, located in West Palm Beach, Florida, in intercollegiate sports as a member of the NCAA Division II ranks, primarily competing in the Sunshine State Conference (SSC) since the 2015–16 academic year as a provisional member for most their sports (achieving D-II full member status in 2016–17); while its men's and women's track & field teams compete as NCAA D-II Independents as the conference does not sponsor these sports. The Sailfish previously competed as an NCAA D-II Independent from 2003–04 to 2014–15; and in the Florida Sun Conference (FSC; now currently known as the Sun Conference since the 2008–09 school year) of the National Association of Intercollegiate Athletics (NAIA) from 1990–91 to 2002–03. The school's colors are navy blue and white.

Varsity teams

Palm Beach Atlantic competes in 18 intercollegiate varsity sports: Men's sports include baseball, basketball, cross country, golf, lacrosse, soccer, tennis and track & field; while women's sports include basketball, beach volleyball, cross country, golf, lacrosse, soccer, softball, tennis, track & field and volleyball.

Facilities
The new Marshall and Vera Lea Rinker Athletic Campus has beach volleyball, soccer, lacrosse, baseball, softball, tennis, and running trails as well as a new state of the art weight and training rooms. The new  building houses locker rooms, meeting rooms as well as athletic offices.

Greene Complex for Sports and Recreation
The Greene is home to the Sailfish men's and women's basketball teams and the volleyball team. It's also the training and treatment center for other PBA athletic teams. There are four locker rooms located in the building along with a unique team room just off the Rubin Arena floor. Staff members for the athletic department and campus recreation department call this building home.

Rubin Arena
This 2,000-seat arena is the home of the Sailfish men's and women's basketball teams as well as the women's volleyball team. The Rubin Arena has two levels of seating that surround the main floor that feature a full-length basketball court for varsity contests, the ability to occupy two volleyball courts, as well as auxiliary basketball goals that lower from the ceiling. This multi-use facility also is equipped with an electrically lowered batting cage in the west mezzanine that can be used for off-season training for the Sailfish baseball and softball teams. The arena also features a unique side room known as "The Team Room" where various athletic teams gather either during games (pregame, halftime, etc.) or for film-review or devotional times as a part of their practice sessions.

Mitch Gornto Tennis Center
The Palm Beach Atlantic men's and women's tennis teams play in the Mitch Gornto Tennis Center. The center has 13 fully lighted courts with shaded seating available in multiple sections of the facility.

References

External links
 
 Official athletics website